The 2013 Kansas City, Kansas mayoral election took place on April 2, 2013, to elect the Mayor/CEO of the United Government of Wyandotte County and Kansas City, Kansas. The election is officially nonpartisan. Incumbent Joe Reardon did not run for a third term. Mark Holland and Ann Murguia were on the ballot in the general election. Holland defeated Murguia by over 1,500 votes.

Primary Election

Candidates
Incumbent Joe Reardon chose not to run for a third term. The following people filed for candidacy.

Nathan Barnes
Mark Holland, pastor
Cordell D. Meeks III
Ann Murguia
Janice (Grant) Witt

Election Results
Holland and Murguia received enough votes to qualify for the general election on April 2, 2013.

General Election

Candidates
Mark Holland
Ann Murguia

Election Results

References

Kansas City
Kansas City
Mayoral elections in Kansas City, Kansas